A stub network, or pocket network, is a somewhat casual term describing a computer network, or part of an internetwork, with no knowledge of other networks, that will typically send much or all of its non-local traffic out via a single path, with the network aware only of a default route to non-local destinations. As a practical analogy, think of an island which is connected to the rest of the world through a bridge and no other path is available either through air or sea. Continuing this analogy, the island might have more than one physical bridge to the mainland, but the set of bridges still represents only one logical path.

 An enterprise  that connects to the corporate network by only one router, or multiple default routers connected to the same logical upstream destination.
 A single LAN which never carries packets between multiple routers connected to it. All traffic is to and/or from local hosts. The routers will only route packets into the LAN if it's destined for the LAN, and out from the LAN if it originated on the LAN.
This stub network is part of the ISP's , discussed below.
 For each interface on which no default route (also called the gateway of last resort) has been elected,  refers to these subnets as stub networks.
 An OSPF stubby area is one which receives routes from other areas in the OSPF domain but for external routes, which are communicated via a Type 5 Link-state advertisement, the stubby area is only aware of a default route
 An OSPF totally stubby area is one which only has a default route to the rest of the OSPF routing domain. Such an area may have more than one router, but these routers will only know about the default route to the outside.
 A stub autonomous system that is connected to only one other autonomous system, through which it gains access to the Internet. This is also called a stub AS, which characterize the great majority of AS connected to the Internet. as of June 30, 2007, there were 224622 routes seen by the  router. These came from 25577 autonomous systems, of which only 74 were transit-only and 22272 were stub/origin-only. 3305 autonomous systems provided some level of transit.

See also 
 Multihoming
 IP transit
 Peering

References 

Network architecture